The German Modena is a breed of fancy pigeon developed over many years of selective breeding. German Modenas, along with other varieties of domesticated pigeons, are all descendants of the rock dove (Columba livia).

See also 
Modena (pigeon)
List of pigeon breeds

References

Pigeon breeds
Pigeon breeds originating in Germany